Pierre Ernst Vilhelm Lindstedt (born 15 August 1943) is a Swedish actor. He has appeared in more than 50 films and television shows since 1966. He is the son of actor Carl-Gustaf Lindstedt.

Selected filmography
Ormen (1966)
The Emigrants (1971)
The New Land (1972)
The Man Who Quit Smoking (1972)
Emil och griseknoen (1973)
T. Sventon praktiserande privatdetektiv (1989) (Julkalendern, TV)
Lotta flyttar hemifrån (1993)
Drömkåken (1993)
Mysteriet på Greveholm (1996)
Jag är din krigare (1997)
Kalle Blomkvist och Rasmus (1997)
Beck – Advokaten (2006)
Oskyldigt dömd (2008) (TV)
Superhjältejul (2009) (TV)
Mysteriet på Greveholm: Grevens återkomst (2012)

References

External links

1943 births
Living people
Swedish male film actors
People from Haninge Municipality
20th-century Swedish male actors
21st-century Swedish male actors
Swedish male television actors